Emma Miloyo is a Kenyan architect, who was reported, in 2017, to be the first woman president of the Architectural Association of Kenya. She serves as the first female president of  the Architectural Association of Kenya since 2017. In October 2016, Archinect.com listed her among the five Emerging Female Architects of East Africa, in  African Great Lakes region countries.

She was born and raised in Nairobi. She attended Loreto Msongari Primary School, before transferring to Kenya High School. She studied architecture at Jomo Kenyatta University of Agriculture and Technology, graduating with a Bachelor of Architecture degree in 2006.
Not only was she the first woman to graduate from Jomo Kenyatta University of Agriculture and Technology with a first-class honours degree in architecture, but she also went on to become the first female president of the Architectural Association of Kenya.

Career
As of October 2018, she was a partner at the architectural firm, Design Source, which she co-founded in January 2007, right out of university. The firm has offices in Nairobi and Mombasa. She was a founding board member of the Konza Technology City Board.

In 2015 Miloyo was selected to participate in the 2nd Women's Leadership Program Eisenhower Fellows.

In June 2015, she was elected as Vice President of the Architectural Association of Kenya, serving in that capacity until February 2017. She became the first female president of the Architectural Association of Kenya in March 2017.

She is interested in inspiring young women to see architecture as a viable career option. In order to support young people, she volunteers her time to help girls in poverty attend school through the Ex-Bomarian Education Trust Fund and is a founding Board Member of WIRE (Women in Real Estate).

Personal life
She is married to Chris Naicca, a fellow architect and classmate at university. Together, they are the parents of three children. Miloyo and Naicca are partners in Design Source Limited, the architectural firm they co-founded in 2007.

Recognition
Business Daily Africa listed her as, one of the Business Daily Africa's Kenya's Top 40 Under 40 Women both in 2011 and 2018

See also
 Topyster Muga
 Esther Muchemi
 Anne Wawira Njiru

References

External links 

People from Nairobi
1981 births
Kenyan women architects
Living people
Kenyan architects
21st-century architects
Jomo Kenyatta University of Agriculture and Technology alumni
Eisenhower Fellows